Fredriksholm Fortress (Fredriksholm festning) was situated on an islet off Kristiansand, Norway. Today the former fortress is in ruins and the site is a popular place for sightseeing.

Complex 
Fredriksholm Fortress was located one kilometer north of the precursor, Christiansø Fortress on Gammeløya. Both fortresses were built to protect Flekkerøy port.  The construction of Frederiksholm Fortress was begun in 1655. After the fort Christiansø was abandoned on 1 May 1658, the stones, building materials and other useful material were transferred to Fredriksholm. The new fortress was completed in 1662. It is named after Frederick III of Denmark.

The fortress was divided into a lower and an upper part. The lower part was a wall that followed the shoreline. The upper part had a tower with a cupola and 2 artillery batteryes. The tower was the residence of the commander, and this was also the royal chambers. Otherwise, there were a number of large and small houses in the Fort area. Fortress walls were of stone, covered outside with turf and palisadeverk. The peat was taken from a cemetery wall in such large quantities that the coffins were almost uncovered. Within the wall there was a gallery. When the fortress was completed, consisted the luminaire of 14 cannons on the lower part and 10 guns on the upper.

The fortress was originally armed with 24 guns from 2-to 34 pounds. In 1700 the fortress was at its largest, armed with 50 cannons. Garrison was in 1658 on the 24 man. The strength of the fortress, however, varied depending on  the threat of war and the season. It could be up to 110 men at the castle during the summer, while there were around 30 in winter. Fredriksholm was timed to be able to accommodate 300 men.

The area known as Batteriodden. Batteriodden was staffed with 96 infantry and 48 artillerymen. The battery was abandoned around 1850.

Destruction 
In 1804 the castle was abandoned. Kristiansand had become more important and more recent and important military facilities, including Christiansholm Fortress and Lagmannsholmen, which was built over four kilometers further up the fjord to protect the city and harbor.

British attack 
On 18 September 1807 during the Napoleonic Wars (see also the Gunboat War) the British Third-rate ship  along with two other ships arrived in Kristiansand. The ships returned after it being fired on by Christiansholm. The ship commander decided to adopt the abandoned fortress Fredriksholm in the fjord, and sprinkle it in the air. The blast cost four Englishmen their lives because the explosion was long in coming. Four men were therefore ordered ashore to see if the fuses had gone out. They had not.
The fortress was partially set in order again in 1808 and then in 1874 to be closed down for good.

Amundsen's South Pole expedition 
When Roald Amundsen set out on the expedition to the South Pole in 1910, Flekkerøy harbor  was last stop in Norway before departure. At the fortress Fredriksholm  nearly a hundred Greenland dogs stayed in anticipation of getting on board the Amundsen's ship Fram.  98 dogs (two had died along the way) arrived at Fredriksholm from Greenland on board the steamer Hans Egede on 4 July 1910. The dogs had been brought from Greenland to Kristiansand to be examined by the State Veterinarian (Stats Dyrlegen), Christopher Juell in order to check the health of the dogs.  The dogs were at Fredriksholm for a little over a month, until 9 August, when they were brought aboard the Fram at the start of Amundsen's South Pole expedition.

Literature in Norwegian 
 Helland-Hansen, Kjeld (1957) Fredriksholm Festning  (Oddernes kommune) 
 Fjørtoft, Jan Egil  (1985) Kanonene ved Skagerak  (Agdin Forlag) 
 Hauschild Fredriksen, Karl  (2007) Hærens Artilleri i Kristiansandsområdet 1556–1995

References 

Ruins in Norway
Fortifications of Kristiansand
Buildings and structures in Kristiansand
Forts in Norway